Ammopelmatus is a genus of insects in the family Stenopelmatidae, one of two genera of large, flightless insects referred to commonly as Jerusalem crickets (or "potato bugs"). They are native to southwestern United States and northwestern Mexico.

Classification
There are 20 species recognized as valid in the genus Ammopelmatus, as presently recognized; 17 of these species were formerly placed in the genus Stenopelmatus. The family Stenopelmatidae contains several Old World genera, but only the genera in the subfamily Stenopelmatinae (all New World) are referred to as Jerusalem crickets.

Species
 Ammopelmatus cahuilaensis
 Ammopelmatus californicus
 Ammopelmatus cephalotes
 Ammopelmatus comanchus
 Ammopelmatus davewerneri
 Ammopelmatus fasciatus
 Ammopelmatus fuscus
 Ammopelmatus hydrocephalus
 Ammopelmatus intermedius
 Ammopelmatus irregularis
 Ammopelmatus kelsoensis
 Ammopelmatus longispina
 Ammopelmatus mescaleroensis
 Ammopelmatus monahansensis
 Ammopelmatus muwu
 Ammopelmatus navajo
 Ammopelmatus nigrocapitatus
 Ammopelmatus oculatus
 Ammopelmatus pictus
 Ammopelmatus terrenus

Notes

References 

Ensifera genera
Stenopelmatoidea
Taxonomy articles created by Polbot